Ruthebach is a river of North Rhine-Westphalia, Germany. It is a left tributary of the Loddenbach north of Harsewinkel. It should not be confused with the Ruthenbach, a direct tributary of the Ems.

See also
List of rivers of North Rhine-Westphalia

References

Rivers of North Rhine-Westphalia
Rivers of Germany